The Next War: Modern Conflict in Europe is a board wargame published by Simulations Publications, Inc. (SPI) in 1978 that simulates a hypothetical Warsaw Pact invasion of Western Europe.

Description
The Next War is a two-player game in which one player invades Western Europe with Warsaw Pact forces in the late 1970s, while the other player defends with NATO forces. The basic game is used for short scenarios. More complex rules allow for weather, supply lines, chemical or nuclear warfare, air and naval operations, airborne troops, amphibious landings, special forces, and electronic warfare. A campaign game of three scenarios covers the first 60 days after an invasion.

Game components
The game box contains:
three  map sheets with a scale of 14 kilometres per hex
 2400 die-cut 1/2" counters, 
32-page rulebook
40-page "Scenarios and Situation Briefing" book
two identical 4-page "Charts & Tables" folders 
Air Allocation Display

Publication history
The Next War was designed by James F. Dunnigan, with artwork and graphic design by Redmond A. Simonsen, and was published by SPI in 1978. The game was a bestseller for SPI. A month before publication, it appeared at number 2 on SPI's Top Ten list just on the basis of preorders. When the game was released in July 1978, it rose to #1 and stayed in SPI's Top Ten for a year.

Reception
In Issue 46 of Moves, Thomas Pratuch noted that "Next War is another 'supergame' from SPI with enough basic and optional rules to keep any gamer studying it for a long time."

In The Guide to Simulations/Games for Education and Training, Richard Rydzel commented, "This is an interesting but complex game. There are so many possible die modifications on attacks that each attack may require ten or fifteen minutes to compute the right odds. Also, keeping track of all the air and antiaircraft units is a burden and subtracts from the game's playability." Ryzdel concluded, "If one wishes to spend the time and effort on this game, it is a good simulation that seems to cover most areas of such conflict."

Awards
At the 1979 Origins Awards, The Next War was a finalist for a Charles S. Roberts Award in two categories: "Best Twentieth Century Game of 1978", and "Best Graphics and Physical Systems of 1978."

Other reviews
Strategy & Tactics Issue 69 (Jul/Aug 1978)
The Wargamer Vol. 1 Issue 7 (Oct. 1978) and Issue 9 (Feb. 1979) 
Fire & Movement Issue 15 (Jan/Feb 1979)
Paper Wars Issue 51 (May/June 2003, p.36)
Line of Departure Issue 62 (Spring/Summer 2008)

References

Board games introduced in 1978
Cold War board wargames
Jim Dunnigan games
Simulations Publications games
Wargames introduced in 1978